KNML ("610 AM, The Sports Animal") is a sports talk formatted radio station owned by Cumulus Media and licensed to Albuquerque, New Mexico. Its studios are located in Downtown Albuquerque and it utilizes daytime and nighttime transmitters that are located within yards of each other in the southwest quadrant of the city, between the Rio Grande and the Albuquerque International Sunport.

Programming
The station has a long history of servicing local sports play by play and information. After a long affiliation with ESPN Radio, it switched to Fox Sports Radio for a time, but has since gone to CBS Sports Radio. It features some University of New Mexico sports teams coverage, mostly women's basketball, but the bulk of UNM coverage is handled by KKOB 770. It is the home of Jim Rome mid-days and Dan Patrick afternoons. After Hours with Amy Lawrence is broadcast midnights. Damon Amendolara is broadcast early mornings. Zach Gelb is broadcast evenings. Scott Ferrall is broadcast late evenings.

The "Opening Drive" with Jeff Siembieda and J.J. Buck is the station's morning drive show. Siembieda has a long history of anchoring local television and is also the executive director of The New Mexico Bowl.

Sports Radio 610 KNML and 95.9 FM is the flagship radio station for the Albuquerque Isotopes. Josh Suchon is the broadcaster for the Albuquerque Isotopes.

David Jubb and Brandon Vogt have been the sole hosts of the afternoon-drive talk show the "Sports Bar" since August 2013, after their co-host, Erik Gee, resigned unexpectedly. The trio had been a group since 2008. Jubb ascended to primary host of the Sports Bar after being hired initially as a midday board operator in April 2008. Vogt, meanwhile, was hired as producer of afternoon drive in March 2008 before becoming a host as well.

FM broadcast
Beginning on November 30, 2017, KNML began broadcast on the FM band over translator station K240BL, licensed to Albuquerque, New Mexico broadcasting at 95.9 MHz. Its power is 250 watts horizontal polarization, and currently has a construction permit to add vertical coverage. It is owned by Carl G. Brasher. It had been silent since April 2017. Previously it had aired programming from KIVA (AM) from 2013 to 2017 and KKNS from 2008 to 2013 and aired various stations in years past.

History

KGGM
KNML was first licensed on August 17, 1927 to Jay Peters in Inglewood, California, with the sequentially assigned call letters of KGGM, as a portable broadcasting station that could be transported between various communities.

In early 1928, promoter C. C. Pyle organized a cross-country foot race divided into daily timed stages and run from Los Angeles to New York City. H. C. Shaw hired the KGGM equipment, carried on a specially prepared school bus, and used it to make broadcasts from the various race destinations. In late March the race was scheduled to end a leg in Albuquerque, and the station was set up to broadcast the runners' arrivals followed by their departures the following day. However, a financial dispute led to the race bypassing the city, although the station continued to shadow the racers as they headed east. On May 10, a front-page article announced that the racers and KGGM had arrived in Elyria, Ohio, where the station was used to make a broadcast featuring Congressional Representative James T. Begg.

KGGM's future began to look cloudy as the race drew to a close. Owner Peters sued Pyle for more than $3,000 in unpaid costs for use of the KGGM facility. A change in policy threatened to delete the KGGM license altogether: in May 1928, the Federal Radio Commission (FRC) had announced that it planned to stop licensing portable facilities after July 1.

Following the conclusion of the race, KGGM went west, passing through Amarillo, Texas, on its way back to Los Angeles. Three days later it was announced that the station had returned to Albuquerque and would make two special broadcasts. By the time the broadcasts were made, tentative plans were already in the works for KGGM to remain in Albuquerque. In the meantime, KGGM was given a 30-day extension on its license, to August 1.

At the end of July, the FCC approved the requests of Peters and Whitmore to license KGGM permanently in Albuquerque, giving the town its first radio station. (At the time, KOB was still in Las Cruces.)  The next year, Peters transferred KGGM's license to Whitmore. At the urging of the city of Albuquerque, Whitmore, who lacked experience in running a radio station, sold KGGM in March 1929 to the New Mexico Broadcasting Company, headed by Anton Hebenstreit. The station affiliated with CBS in 1939.

KGGM broadcast on 1470 kHz both as a portable station and during its initial months in Albuquerque. On November 11, 1928, as part of a nationwide reallocation by the FRC under its General Order 40, it moved to 1370 kHz, which was followed a move to 1230 kHz in early 1929. Two attempts to move down the dial were rejected, and on March 29, 1941, KGGM, along with the other stations on 1230 kHz, moved to 1260 kHz due to the implementation of the North American Regional Broadcasting Agreement (NARBA). In 1946 the station was granted approval to move to its current frequency of 610 kHz, which took place on May 9, 1947 and allowed sister station KVSF in Santa Fe to upgrade by relocating to the vacated 1260 kHz assignment.

KRKE and KZSS

In 1973, citing their desire to focus on television and comply with multiple ownership rules (the combination with KVSF remained grandfathered), KGGM radio was sold to Gaylord Broadcasting for $720,000. The call letters were changed to KRKE on December 31.

The call letters changed again in 1986 to KZSS, after which the station began simulcasting KZRR-FM for nearly a decade. In 1997 KZSS began running a "personal achievement" format, which in 1999 was traded off for the 95.1 FM frequency with KSVA. Citadel then traded KHTL 920 AM for 610 AM. Citadel merged with Cumulus Media on September 16, 2011.

The Sports Animal

The Sports Animal format began in 1994, originally appearing on KRZY AM 1450. In 1996, after KRZY had been sold to a Spanish-language broadcaster, Citadel Broadcasting moved the Sports Animal format to 1050 AM, now using KNML as a call sign. In 2000 the Sports Animal format was moved once again to its current home at 610 AM, the second-strongest AM signal in Albuquerque, which included the transfer of the KNML call letters.
 
KNML was the home of Don Imus until April 12, 2007. Previous program directors include: Andrew Paul (now with KXNT in Las Vegas), Dennis Glasgow and Ian Martin, who worked for the station beginning in 1999 and resigned during the week of July 15, 2008.  Other station personalities included: Gary Herron (KQTM), Dom Zarella, Jeff Lukas, Blake Taylor, Bob Clark (KKOB), and Mike Powers (KRQE).

References

External links
KNML station website

FCC History Cards for KNML (covering KGGM / KRKE for 1927–1980)

Sports radio stations in the United States
Cumulus Media radio stations
NML
Radio stations established in 1994
CBS Sports Radio stations
1994 establishments in New Mexico